Dibba Al Fujairah Football Club, known as Dibba Al Fujairah or simply Dibba, is an Emirati professional football club in Dibba Al-Fujairah. As their own stadium, Dibba Al Fujairah Stadium, doesn't fit UAE Pro-League requirements, the club shared the Fujairah Club Stadium with Fujairah FC during their short stay in the Pro League from 2015 to 2019.

Coaching staff

Current squad
As of UAE Division One:

Honours
 UAE Division One: 2
 2014–15, 2021-22.

Pro-League Record

Notes 2019–20 UAE football season was cancelled due to the COVID-19 pandemic in the United Arab Emirates.

Key
 Pos. = Position
 Tms. = Number of teams
 Lvl. = League

References

External links
 Official website

Dibba FC
Dibba
1976 establishments in the United Arab Emirates
Association football clubs established in 1976
Organisations based in the Emirate of Fujairah
Sport in the Emirate of Fujairah